Ghaleb Zu'bi (born 1943) is a Jordanian lawyer and politician who served in different post at the various cabinets of the Hashemite Kingdom of Jordan. Zu'bi was appointed minister of interior by Prime Minister Hani Al-Mulki on 15 January 2017 and served in the post until 25 February 2018.

Early life and education
Zu'bi was born in Salt in 1943. He hails from one of the Jordan’s largest tribes in Salt city. He obtained a bachelor's degree in law from Damascus University in 1967. He also holds a master's degree in law, which he received in Egypt in 1981.

Career
After working as lawyer, Zu'bi joined politics. Then he served as director of the anti-narcotics department, the Amman police department, and assistant director of the public security department. Next, he served as member of parliament for two terms, from 1997 to 2001 and from 2003 to 2007. He was a deputy for East Bank, the first district of Balqa. During his term, he served as head of the legal committee in the lower house for eight years. His first cabinet post was the minister of state for parliamentary affairs and he was appointed to the cabinet led by Prime Minister Nader Dahabi in a reshuffle on 23 February 2009.

In May 2012, Zu'bi was appointed interior minister to the second cabinet of Prime Minister Fayez Tarawneh, replacing Mohammad Al Raoud. Zu'bi's term as interior minister lasted until 11 October 2012 when he was appointed justice minister to the cabinet headed by Prime Minister Abdullah Ensour. On 30 March 2013, Zu'bi was replaced by Ahmad Ziadat as justice minister. On 15 January 2017, Zu'bi replaced Salameh Hammad in a government reshuffle. Zu'bi served until 25 February 2018.

References

1943 births
Living people
Damascus University alumni
20th-century Jordanian lawyers
Jordanian Muslims
Government ministers of Jordan
Interior ministers of Jordan
Justice ministers of Jordan